John Carlton Atherton  (January 7, 1900 - September 16, 1952) was an American painter and magazine illustrator, writer and designer. His works form part of numerous collections, including the Museum of Modern Art, Whitney Museum of American Art and the Smithsonian American Art Museum.

Early Years
He was the son of James Chester Atherton (1868-1928) and Carrie B. Martin (1871-1909). He was born in Brainerd, Minnesota. His father was Canadian born. His parents relocated from Minnesota to Washington State, with his maternal grandparents whilst he was still an infant. He attended high school in Spokane, Washington.

Career
During his early years he never displayed an aptitude for art; rather, his first love being nature and the activities he relished there, mainly fishing and hunting. He enlisted in 1917, serving briefly in the U.S. Navy for a year during World War I. At the end of the war, determined to get an education he worked various part-time jobs, as a sign painter and playing a banjo in a dance band to pay his enrolment fee at the College of the Pacific and The California School of Fine Arts (now the San Francisco Art Institute).  Once there, he also worked in the surrounding studios developing his oil painting techniques.

A first prize award of $500 at the annual exhibition of the Bohemian Club in 1929, financed his one way trip to New York City, which helped to launch his career as an artist.

Atherton had aspired to be a fine artist, however his first paid jobs were for commercial art firms designing advertisements for corporations such as General Motors, Shell Oil, Container Corporation of America, and Dole. However, by 1936, encouraged primarily by friends, such as Alexander Brook, an acclaimed New York realist painter, he returned to the fine arts.

Atherton continued to accept numerous commissions for magazine illustrations; such as Fortune magazine, and over the years he would paint more than forty covers for The Saturday Evening Post starting with his December 1942 design, “Patient Dog.” This picture is reminiscent of his friend Norman Rockwell ‘Americana style’ and captures a poignant moment of nostalgia, where  a loyal dog looks toward a wall of hunting equipment and a framed picture of his owner in military uniform.

Selected One person Exhibitions
Atherton accomplished his first one-man show in Manhattan in 1936. His Painting, “The Black Horse” won the $3000 fourth prize from among a pool of 14,000 entries. This painting forms part of the Metropolitan Museum of Art collection in New York.

Atherton achieved recognition in New York City and elsewhere during the 1930s. Having exhibited at the Julien Levy Gallery in New York, his paintings began to be collected by museums; including the Museum of Modern Art and the Metropolitan Museum of Art.

His reputation increased with his art deco stone lithograph poster for the 1939 New York World's Fair.  In 1941, his design won first place in the Museum of Modern Arts “National Defense Poster Competition”.

Selected Public Collections
Fleming Museum of Art, Burlington, Vermont
Albright-Knox Art Gallery, Buffalo, NY
Art Institute of Chicago, Chicago
Wadsworth Atheneum, Hartford, CT
Brooklyn Museum of Art, New York
Metropolitan Museum of Art, New York
The Museum of Modern Art, New York
Whitney Museum of American Art, New York
Pennsylvania Academy of the Fine Arts, Philadelphia
De Young Museum, San Francisco
Smithsonian American Art Museum, Washington DC
Butler Institute of American Art Youngstown, OH

The Famous Artists School

Founded in 1948 in Westport, Connecticut, U.S.A.  The idea was conceived by members of the New York Society of Illustrators (SOI), but due to the Society's legal status, could not be operated by it. SOI member Albert Dorne led the initiative to set up a separate entity, and recruited the support of Norman Rockwell, who was also an SOI member. For the founding faculty, Dorne recruited Atherton, as well as accomplished artists such as Austin Briggs, Stevan Dohanos, Robert Fawcett, Peter Helck, Fred Ludekens, Al Parker, Norman Rockwell, Ben Stahl, Harold von Schmidt and Jon Whitcomb.

He collaborated with Jon Whitcomb with the book “How I Make a Picture: Lesson 1-9, Parts 1”.

Society of Illustrators

Atherton as an active member from his arrival in New York.  The society have owned many of his works. Ex-collection includes:

 Rocking Horse (ca. 1949) 

Atherton, as his peers had many of his works framed by Henry Heydenryk Jr.

Personal
On November 2, 1926, he married Polly “Maxine” Breese (1903-1997). They had one daughter, Mary Atherton, born in 1932.

Atherton's often chose industrial landscapes, however found himself spending considerable time in Westport, Connecticut, with an active artistic community, and it became home for him, and his family. He then moved to Arlington, Vermont.

Norman Rockwell enlisted Atherton in what was to be the only collaborative painting in his career.

He was part of a group of artists including a Norman Rockwell, Mead Schaeffer and George Hughes who established residences in Arlington. Atherton and Mead Schaeffer were avid fly fishermen and they carefully chose the location for the group, conveniently located near the legendary Battenkill River.

In his free time, Atherton continued to enjoy fly-fishing. He brought his artistic talent into the field of fishing, when he wrote and illustrated the fishing classic, “The Fly and The Fish”.

He died in New Brunswick, Canada in 1952, at the age of 52 in a drowning accident while fly-fishing.

Legacy

The Western Connecticut State University holds an extensive archive on this artist.

His wife, Maxine also published a memoir “The Fly Fisher and the River”  She married Watson Wyckoff in 1960.

Ancestry
He is a direct descendant of James Atherton, one of the First Settlers of New England; who arrived in Dorchester, Massachusetts in the 1630s.

His direct ancestor, Benjamin Atherton was from Colonial Massachusetts and settled in Maugerville, New Brunswick in 1765. His grandfather, Albert Atherton (1833-1922) was a lumber merchant who relocated to Minnesota between 1881 and 1885. His Canadian born aunt, Maggie L Atherton (1865-1946), gave an account of the Atherton ancestry and retained a number of newspaper clippings of Atherton‘s painting winning the first prize of $500 awarded by Senator James D. Phelan in San Francisco in 1929.

Biography
 Falk, Peter H., ed. “Who Was Who in American Art”. Madison, CT: Sound View Press, 1999.
 
 Berman, Greta/Wechsler, Jeffrey, “Realism and Realities: The Other Side of American Painting, 1940-1960,” The Gallery: New Brunswick, NJ, 1981.

 Cohn, Jan, Covers of the Saturday Evening Post: Seventy Years of Outstanding Illustration, Studio (October 1, 1995).

 Hughes, Edan, Artists in California, 1786–1940

 Watson, Ernest W, “Forty American Illustrators and How they Work”: Watson-Guptill Publications, 1946

References

External links
 Interview with Margaret L. Atherton, Brainerd, Minnesota contains memorabilia from the artist and his ancestry 

1900 births
1952 deaths
20th-century American artists